Ambiegna is a commune in the Corse-du-Sud department of France on the island of Corsica.

Geography

Ambiegna is located some 25 km in a direct line north of Ajaccio and 5 km east of Sagone. It can be accessed by the D25 road from Casaglione in the south or by the D1 road from Solane in the south-west both going to the village on the eastern side of the commune. The D1 road continues north to Le Truggia by a tortuous route. The commune is remote and rugged with dense forests.

The north-western border of the commune entirely consists of a large river flowing to the west.

Neighbouring communes and villages

Administration

List of Successive Mayors

Demography
In 2017 the commune had 68 inhabitants.

Culture and heritage

Civil heritage

The commune has a number of buildings and structures that are registered as historical monuments:
A Rotary Oil Mill (20th century)
The Marchi family House (1) (1733)
The Marchi family House (2) (1861)
The Defranchi family House (1866)
A House (6) (1855)
A House (7) (18th century)
A Fabrica di Pipa Sawmill (1893)
A Flour Mill (18th century)
A former Presbytery (1871)
A former School now the Town Hall (1886)
Houses (18th-19th century)

Religious heritage
The Parish Church of Saint-Côme and Saint-Damien (19th century) is registered as an historical monument. The Church contains many items that are registered as historical objects:

A Painting: Virgin and child with Saints (17th century)
A Ciborium (20th century)
A Statuette for Collections (20th century)
A Sunburst Monstrance (19th century)
A Chalice with Paten (19th century)
A Chalice (18th century)
A set of 2 Altar Candlesticks (17th century)
A Pail for Holy water (19th century)
An Altar Painting: Virgin and child surrounded by Saints (17th century)
A Statuette: the Child Jesus (19th century)
A Painting: Saint Antoine of Padua and the child Jesus (18th century)
A Statue: Saint Antoine of Padua and the child Jesus (19th century)
A Baptismal font (18th century)
The Furniture in the Church

See also
Communes of the Corse-du-Sud department

References

External links

Ambiegna on Géoportail, National Geographic Institute (IGN) website 

Communes of Corse-du-Sud